Rosenthal–Kloepfer syndrome, is a cutaneous condition characterized by abnormal growth of bone and skin, coupled with clouding of the cornea. It was described in 1962. Another name for the condition is Acromegaly-cutis verticis gyrata-corneal leukoma syndrome.

Signs and Symptoms 
Presenting symptoms include unilateral or bilateral opacification of the cornea, which progressively involves the whole structure. Visual disturbance secondary to corneal opacification is often the presenting symptom. Other symptoms include furrowing of the scalp, enlargement of the bony portion of the eyebrows, and disproportionately large hands.

Cause 
No gene mutation as has been associated with this disorder. Inheritance follows an autosomal dominant pattern.

Diagnosis 
Radiographic imaging reveals thickening of bones, especially of the skull, and widening of the bones in the fingers.

See also 
 Amniotic band syndrome
 List of cutaneous conditions

References

External links 

Cutaneous congenital anomalies
Genetic disorders with OMIM but no gene
Syndromes